Rigoberto Romero Carmona (September 22, 1940 in Pinar del Río, Cuba – August 25, 1991 in Havana) was a Cuban photographer.

Individual exhibitions
In 1982, Romero presented the solo exhibition  El patio de mi casa no es particular, seen at the Premio de Fotografía Cubana, Galería 10 de Octubre, Havana. That same year he presented  Dos fotógrafos cubanos [Iván Cañas/Rigoberto Romero] at the Asociación de Amistad Cuba Finlandia, in Helsinki, Finland. In 1988, he exhibited Con sudor de millonario at the Casa de la Amistad Cubano Finlandesa, Helsinki.

In 1992, he presented Direct from Cuba [José A. Figueroa/Rigoberto Romero/Mario Díaz] at Raleigh Studios, Hollywood, California.

Collective exhibitions
In 1986, Romero participated in the Second Havana biennial, held at the Museo Nacional de Bellas Artes, Havana.

In 1991, his work was included in the show Fotografía Cubana Contemporánea en 150 Imágenes, Taller Internacional de la Imagen Fotográfica, a collateral exhibition to the Cuarta Havana Biennial, shown at the Centro de Prensa Internacional, Havana. In 1998 he was one of the selected artists for  Cuba: 100 años de fotografía, seen at Casa de América, Madrid, Spain.

Awards
In 1976 Romero received a Mention in the VI Salón Nacional de Fotografía, Unión de Periodistas de Cuba, Havana. In 1981 he won the Prize (collective) at the Premio de Fotografía Contemporánea Latinoamericana y del Caribe, Galería Latinoamericana, Casa de las Américas, Havana. In 1982, he was awarded a Mention in Photography at the Salón de Artes Plásticas UNEAC '82, Museo Nacional de Bellas Artes, Havana.

Collections
His works are in collections such as the Casa de las Américas, Havana, and the Center for Cuban Studies, New York. His works can be seen in the Consejo Mexicano de Fotografía, Mexico, and in the Fototeca de Cuba, Havana.

References
  Jose Veigas-Zamora, Cristina Vives Gutierrez, Adolfo V. Nodal, Valia Garzon, Dannys Montes de Oca. Memoria: Cuban Art of the 20th Century. California/International Arts Foundation, 2001. 
 Jose Viegas. Memoria: Artes Visuales Cubanas Del Siglo Xx. California International Arts, 2004.

External links
 http://www.latinart.com/artdetail.cfm?img=cu_romer_01_th.jpg&type=exhibit
 https://web.archive.org/web/20070628205627/http://www.antecamara.com.mx/nuevo/modules.php?op=modload&name=PagEd&file=index&topic_id=&page_id=649&ppart=2
 https://web.archive.org/web/20080110010310/http://www.cubaupdate.org/newpage.htm
 http://findarticles.com/p/articles/mi_m1248/is_10_89/ai_79276154

1940 births
1991 deaths
Cuban contemporary artists